Batocera andamana is a species of beetle in the family Cerambycidae. It was described by Thomson in 1878. It is known from the Andaman Islands, where it is very common.

References

Batocerini
Beetles described in 1878